Javakhians are an ethnic subgroup of Georgians, mainly living in Samtskhe-Javakheti region of Georgia. Javakhians are the indigenous population of Javakheti. In terminology, the name Javakheti is taken from "javakh" core with traditional Georgian –eti suffix; commonly, Javakheti means the home of Javakhs. Javakhians speak the Georgian language in Javakhian dialect. The self-designation of Javakhians is Javakhi.

History 
Javakhians are one of the earliest Georgian tribes that inhabited southern Georgia from ancient times. The earliest mention of Javakhians was found in Urartu sources, in the notes of king Argishti I of Urartu, 785 BC, as “Zabakha” or “Zabakhian”. It could mean that until the beginning of the 8th century B.C. Javakhians had been a self-governing tribe. According to Cyril Toumanoff, Javakheti was part of the Iberian duchy of Tsunda from the 4th or 3rd century BC. Saint Nino entered Iberia from Javakheti, one of the southern provinces of Iberia, and, following the course of the River Kura, she arrived in Mtskheta, the capital of the kingdom, once there, she eventually began to preach Christianity, which culminated by Christianization of Iberia.

Ukhtanes of Sebastia talks about the family tree of Kyrion, the Catholicos of Georgia. The literal translation of this text is as follows: Kyrion "came from the Georgians in terms of country and lineage, from the region of the Javakhs." There can be no doubt that Ukhtanes believed Javakheti to be part of Georgia (Iberia), and the Javakhs to be Georgians.

References

Ethnic groups in Georgia (country)
Peoples of the Caucasus